The 2016 Regions Tradition was a senior major golf championship and the 28th Regions Tradition, held from May 19-22 at Greystone Golf & Country Club in Hoover, Alabama. It was the first Regions Tradition played at the course.

World Golf Hall of Fame member Bernhard Langer won his first Regions Tradition and his sixth senior major championship by 6 strokes over Olin Browne.

Venue

The 2016 event was the first Regions Tradition played at Greystone Golf & Country Club.

Course layout

Field
The field consisted of 81 professional competitors.

Nationalities in the field

Past champions in the field

Round summaries

First round
Thursday, May 19, 2016

2014 Tradition champion Kenny Perry posted an eight-under-par 64 on day one to lead by two strokes over Bernhard Langer and Gene Sauers.

Second round
Friday, May 20, 2016

Kenny Perry shot a 70 (−2) in the second round to lead by one stroke over Bernhard Langer and Billy Andrade.

Third round
Saturday, May 21, 2016

Bernhard Langer shot 69 (−3) in the third round to take a four stroke lead into the final round. Kenny Perry double bogeyed the first hole on Saturday and went on to shoot a two-over-par 74, falling into a tie for second place with Scott McCarron.

Final round
Sunday, May 22, 2016

Bernhard Langer extended his lead to five strokes after birdieing the par-4 1st hole. Olin Browne moved into a tie for second with Kirk Triplett after making eagle on the par-5 2nd hole. Browne cut Langer's lead to three after birdieing #10, but Langer responded with birdies on the 12th and 13th holes to regain a four shot lead. Leading by four with three holes to play, Langer birdied the 16, 17, and 18 and defeated Browne by six strokes.

Scorecard

Cumulative tournament scores, relative to par

Notes and references

Senior major golf championships
Regions Tradition